Allium kermesinum is a flowering plant in the genus Allium known by the common name crimson leek or Kamnik leek. It is endemic to Slovenia.

Description
Allium kermesinum has a long bulb, with ridged leaves similar to those of chives. The flowers vary from red to pink and are faintly fragrant, reminiscent of garlic. It blossoms between August and September. It is endemic to Slovenia, where it grows in the Kamnik–Savinja Alps.

References

External links

Flora of Slovenia
kermesinum
Taxa named by Ludwig Reichenbach